Enhanced Data rates for GSM Evolution (EDGE) also known as Enhanced GPRS (EGPRS), IMT Single Carrier (IMT-SC), or Enhanced Data rates for Global Evolution) is a digital mobile phone technology that allows improved data transmission rates as a backward-compatible extension of GSM. EDGE is considered a pre-3G radio technology and is part of ITU's 3G definition. EDGE was deployed on GSM networks beginning in 2003 – initially by Cingular (now AT&T) in the United States.

EDGE is standardized also by 3GPP as part of the GSM family. A variant, so called Compact-EDGE, was developed for use in a portion of Digital AMPS network spectrum.

Through the introduction of sophisticated methods of coding and transmitting data, EDGE delivers higher bit-rates per radio channel, resulting in a threefold increase in capacity and performance compared with an ordinary GSM/GPRS connection.

EDGE can be used for any packet switched application, such as an Internet connection.

Evolved EDGE continues in release 7 of the 3GPP standard providing reduced latency and more than doubled performance e.g. to complement High-Speed Packet Access (HSPA). Peak bit-rates of up to 1 Mbit/s and typical bit-rates of 400 kbit/s can be expected.

Technology 

EDGE/EGPRS is implemented as a bolt-on enhancement for 2.5G GSM/GPRS networks, making it easier for existing GSM carriers to upgrade to it. EDGE is a superset to GPRS and can function on any network with GPRS deployed on it, provided the carrier implements the necessary upgrade.
EDGE requires no hardware or software changes to be made in GSM core networks. EDGE-compatible transceiver units must be installed and the base station subsystem needs to be upgraded to support EDGE. If the operator already has this in place, which is often the case today, the network can be upgraded to EDGE by activating an optional software feature. Today EDGE is supported by all major chip vendors for both GSM and WCDMA/HSPA.

Transmission techniques 
In addition to Gaussian minimum-shift keying (GMSK), EDGE uses higher-order PSK/8 phase-shift keying (8PSK) for the upper five of its nine modulation and coding schemes. EDGE produces a 3-bit word for every change in carrier phase. This effectively triples the gross data rate offered by GSM. EDGE, like GPRS, uses a rate adaptation algorithm that adapts the modulation and coding scheme (MCS) according to the quality of the radio channel, and thus the bit rate and robustness of data transmission. It introduces a new technology not found in GPRS, incremental redundancy, which, instead of retransmitting disturbed packets, sends more redundancy information to be combined in the receiver. This increases the probability of correct decoding.

EDGE can carry a bandwidth up to 236 kbit/s (with end-to-end latency of less than 150 ms) for 4 timeslots (theoretical maximum is 473.6 kbit/s for 8 timeslots) in packet mode. This means it can handle four times as much traffic as standard GPRS. EDGE meets the International Telecommunication Union's requirement for a 3G network, and has been accepted by the ITU as part of the IMT-2000 family of 3G standards. It also enhances the circuit data mode called HSCSD, increasing the data rate of this service.

EDGE modulation and coding scheme (MCS) 
The channel encoding process in GPRS as well as EGPRS/EDGE consists of two steps: first, a cyclic code is used to add parity bits, which are also referred to as the Block Check Sequence, followed by coding with a possibly punctured convolutional code. In GPRS, the Coding Schemes CS-1 to CS-4 specify the number of parity bits generated by the cyclic code and the puncturing rate of the convolutional code. In GPRS Coding Schemes CS-1 through CS-3, the convolutional code is of rate 1/2, i.e. each input bit is converted into two coded bits. In Coding Schemes CS-2 and CS-3, the output of the convolutional code is punctured to achieve the desired code rate. In GPRS Coding Scheme CS-4, no convolutional coding is applied.

In EGPRS/EDGE, the modulation and coding schemes MCS-1 to MCS-9 take the place of the coding schemes of GPRS, and additionally specify which modulation scheme is used, GMSK or 8PSK. MCS-1 through MCS-4 use GMSK and have performance similar (but not equal) to GPRS, while MCS-5 through MCS-9 use 8PSK. In all EGPRS modulation and coding schemes, a convolutional code of rate 1/3 is used, and puncturing is used to achieve the desired code rate. In contrast to GPRS, the Radio Link Control (RLC) and Media Access Control (MAC) headers and the payload data are coded separately in EGPRS. The headers are coded more robustly than the data.

Evolved EDGE 
Evolved EDGE, also called EDGE Evolution, is a bolt-on extension to the GSM mobile telephony standard, which improves on EDGE in a number of ways. Latencies are reduced by lowering the Transmission Time Interval by half (from 20 ms to 10 ms). Bit rates are increased up to 1 Mbit/s peak bandwidth and latencies down to 80 ms using dual carrier, higher symbol rate and higher-order modulation (32QAM and 16QAM instead of 8PSK), and turbo codes to improve error correction. This results in real world downlink speeds of up to 600kbit/s. Further the signal quality is improved using dual antennas improving average bit-rates and spectrum efficiency.

The main intention of increasing the existing EDGE throughput is that many operators would like to upgrade their existing infrastructure rather than invest on new network infrastructure. Mobile operators have invested billions in GSM networks, many of which are already capable of supporting EDGE data speeds up to 236.8 kbit/s. With a software upgrade and a new device compliant with Evolved EDGE (like an Evolved EDGE smartphone) for the user, these data rates can be boosted to speeds approaching 1 Mbit/s (i.e. 98.6 kbit/s per timeslot for 32QAM). Many service providers may not invest in a completely new technology like 3G networks.

Considerable research and development happened throughout the world for this new technology. A successful trial by Nokia Siemens and "one of China's leading operators" has been achieved in a live environment. With the introduction for more advanced wireless technologies like UMTS and LTE, which also focus on a network coverage layer on low frequencies and the upcoming phase-out and shutdown of 2G mobile networks, it is very unlikely that Evolved EDGE will ever see any deployment on live networks. Up to now (as of 2016) there are no commercial networks which support the Evolved EDGE standard (3GPP Rel-7).

Technology

Reduced Latency 
With Evolved EDGE come three major features designed to reduce latency over the air interface.

In EDGE, a single RLC data block (ranging from 23 to 148 bytes of data) is transmitted over four frames, using a single time slot. On average, this requires 20 ms for one way transmission. Under the RTTI scheme, one data block is transmitted over two frames in two timeslots, reducing the latency of the air interface to 10 ms.

In addition, Reduced Latency also implies support of Piggy-backed ACK/NACK (PAN), in which a bitmap of blocks not received is included in normal data blocks. Using the PAN field, the receiver may report missing data blocks immediately, rather than waiting to send a dedicated PAN message.

A final enhancement is RLC-non persistent mode. With EDGE, the RLC interface could operate in either acknowledged mode, or unacknowledged mode. In unacknowledged mode, there is no retransmission of missing data blocks, so a single corrupt block would cause an entire upper-layer IP packet to be lost. With non-persistent mode, an RLC data block may be retransmitted if it is less than a certain age. Once this time expires, it is considered lost, and subsequent data blocks may then be forwarded to upper layers.

.

Higher modulation schemes 
Both uplink and downlink throughput is improved by using 16 or 32 QAM (quadrature amplitude modulation), along with turbo codes and higher symbol rates.

Networks 

The Global mobile Suppliers Association (GSA) states that, as of May 2013, there were 604 GSM/EDGE networks in 213 countries, from a total of 606 mobile network operator commitments in 213 countries.

See also 

 Broadband Internet access
 CDMA2000
 Evolution-Data Optimized
 List of device bandwidths
 Mobile broadband
 Spectral efficiency comparison table
 UMTS
 WiDEN
 Wi-Fi
 Comparison of mobile phone standards including LTE
 Comparison of wireless data standards including WiMAX and HSPA+

References

External links 
 The Global mobile Suppliers Association
 Evolved EDGE as an alternative to 3G
 A technical document by the 3G Americas association
 An opinion on evolved EDGE by Martin Sauter
 An EDGE Evolution report by Visant Strategies

GSM standard
Telecommunications-related introductions in 2003
Videotelephony